David Hagaman House is a historic home located at Rochester in Monroe County, New York. It was constructed about 1840 and is a typical example of vernacular Greek Revival style rural domestic architecture in Western New York.  The main block is a -story brick structure with a gable roof.

It was listed on the National Register of Historic Places in 1994.

References

Houses in Rochester, New York
Houses on the National Register of Historic Places in New York (state)
Greek Revival houses in New York (state)
Houses completed in 1840
National Register of Historic Places in Rochester, New York